Kiddle is a surname of English origin. 

Notable people with that name include:
 Bob Kiddle (1869–1918), English amateur footballer
 Francis Kiddle (1942–2015), British philatelist
 Frederick B. Kiddle (1874–1951), English pianist, organist and accompanist
 Henry Kiddle (1824–1891), British-born United States educator and spiritualist
 Jackie Kiddle (born 1994), New Zealand rower
 John Kiddle (cricketer)
 Margaret Loch Kiddle (1914–1958), Australian writer and historian

See also 
 Kittle (surname)
Kiddle (search engine)